Harold Edward Carris (7 July 1909 – 29 July 1959) was an English first-class cricketer active 1928–33 who played for Middlesex. He was born in Flixton, Lancashire; died in Cheadle Hulme.

References

1909 births
1959 deaths
English cricketers
Middlesex cricketers
Cambridge University cricketers